Campylobacter showae is a species of Campylobacter found in humans. It is gram-negative, straight rod-shaped, motile by means of multiple unipolar flagella. It is asaccharolytic and prefers an anaerobic atmosphere. SU A4 (= ATCC 51146) is its type strain. Its genome has been sequenced.

References

Further reading

External links

LPSN
Type strain of Campylobacter showae at BacDive -  the Bacterial Diversity Metadatabase

Campylobacterota
Bacteria described in 1993